HMS Florentina (or sometimes Florentia or Florentine), was the Spanish frigate Santa Florentina, built in 1786 at Cartagena, Spain to a design completed on 17 October 1785 by José Romero Fernández de Landa, modified from his earlier design for the Santa Casilda. The British Royal Navy captured her on 6 April 1800 and took her into service as HMS Florentina. She served in the Mediterranean until she returned to Britain in 1802 after the Treaty of Amiens. There the Admiralty had her laid-up in ordinary and she was sold in 1803.

Spanish Navy service
Santa Florentina was commissioned in March 1787 under the flag of CdE Francisco de Borja, and sailed to Cadiz for trials. In November 1787 she was under CdF José Zurita, ferrying troops from Barcelona to Palma de Mallorca, where she arrived on 10 January 1788. In 1789, under CfF José Ussel de Guimbarda, she transported Spanish consuls to Algeria and Tunisia, .

Capture

On 5 April the squadron sighted a Spanish convoy comprising thirteen merchant vessels and three accompanying frigates, and at once gave chase. Leviathan and Emerald eventually opened fire on the rigging of two Spanish frigates in order to disable them; shortly afterward, both Spanish frigates surrendered.

Nuestra Señora del Carmen (Carmen or Carmine), Captain Don Fraquin Porcel, of 36 guns, 140 men, and 950 tons (bm), was sailing from Cadiz to Lima with a cargo of 1500 quintals of mercury, sundries of "Cards", and four 24-pounder guns stored for foreign service. She was newly coppered and had provisions for a four month voyage. She carried as a passenger Don Pedro Ynsencio Bejarano, Archbishop of Buenos Aires. Before she surrendered Carmen had 11 men killed and 16 wounded.

Florentina, Lieutenant Manuel Novales, of 34 guns, 114 men, and 950 tons (bm), had been traveling from Cadiz to Lima with 1500 quintals of mercury and sundry "Cards", and five 24-pounder guns. Before she surrendered she suffered 12 killed and 10 wounded, including Norates and her second captains.

On 7 April, the British sailed for Gibraltar with their prizes. On arrival they encountered Incendiary, which had made port the previous day with two captured vessels of its own. In all, the small British squadron managed to capture nine merchant vessels and two frigates. The Royal Navy took both frigates into service.

British Navy service

In December Florentina was in company with the sloop  and the gunvessel . On 5 December they captured the French polacre Union, bound from Alexandria to France with a cargo of rice and coffee. Two days later, the same three vessels captured the French brig Bon Pasteur Retrouve on the same route with rice, coffee, and sugar. Six days after that, the same three vessels captured the French brig Heureuse Clairon and her cargo of rice and coffee.

On 8 January 1801  captured the French bombard St. Roche, which was carrying wine, liqueurs, ironware, Delfth cloth, and various other merchandise, from Marseilles to Alexandria.

In March 1801 Florentina was at the British landing at Abu Qir Bay. She is not among the vessels listed as having suffered casualties in the landing, but for his services, Broughton received a gold medal from Ottoman Sultan Selim.

Because Florentina served in the Navy's Egyptian campaign between 8 March 1801 and 2 September, her officers and crew qualified for the clasp "Egypt" to the Naval General Service Medal that the Admiralty authorised in 1850 for all surviving claimants.

Broughton received promotion to post-captain on 3 August 1801.

Fate
Florentine [sic] arrived at Portsmouth on 28 May 1802 with dispatches from Malta. She sailed eastward on 11 June to be paid off. She arrived at Deptford on 17 June and was laid up.

The Principal Officers and Commissioners of His Majesty's Navy offered "Florentina, 943 Tons, Copper-bottomed, lying at Deptford", for sale on 1 December 1802. She did not sell until 1803.

Notes

Citations

References
 

1786 ships
Frigates of the Spanish Navy
Captured ships
Frigates of the Royal Navy
Ships built in Cartagena, Spain